Takashi Okamura may refer to:

Takashi Okamura (comedian) (born 1970), Japanese comedian
Takashi Okamura (photographer) (born 1927), Japanese photographer